The 4th congressional district of Illinois includes part of Cook County, and has been represented by Democrat Jesús "Chuy" García since January 2019.

In November 2017, incumbent Luis Gutiérrez announced that he would retire from Congress at the end of his current term, and not seek re-election in 2018. Jesús "Chuy" García was elected on November 6, 2018.

The previous version of the district from 2013-2023 was featured by The Economist as one of the most strangely drawn and gerrymandered congressional districts in the country, inspired the "Ugly Gerry" gerrymandering typeface, and has been nicknamed "earmuffs" due to its shape. That version of the district was created after federal courts ordered the creation of a majority-Hispanic district in the Chicago area. The Illinois General Assembly responded by packing two majority Hispanic parts of Chicago into a single district.

The 2013-2023 version of the district formerly covered two strips running east–west across the city of Chicago, on the west side continuing into smaller portions of some suburban areas in Cook County, surrounding Illinois's 7th congressional district. The northern portion is largely Puerto Rican, while the southern portion is heavily Mexican-American. These two sections were only connected by a piece of Interstate 294 to the west; the highway is in the district while the surrounding areas are not. This version of the district was the smallest congressional district in area outside New York City and California.

History

The Illinois 4th congressional district was originally formed in 1842.  It included 17 counties, which were Cook, Lake, McHenry,  Boone, De Kalb, Kane, Du Page, Will, Kendall, Grundy, La Salle, Bureau, Livingston, Iroquois, McLean, Vermilion and Champaign Counties.  Beyond this Ford and Kankakee Counties were part of Vermillion and Iroquois Counties respectively at this point and thus in the district's boundaries.

In the redistricting following the 1990 United States Census, Chicago Mayor Richard M. Daley and Governor Jim Edgar both wanted a Latino district, as Latinos were the fastest growing demographic group in the state at the time. In June 1991, Congressman Dennis Hastert, a suburban Republican, filed a federal lawsuit claiming that the existing congressional map was unconstitutional; the present congressional district boundaries emerged as a result of that lawsuit. A three-judge panel of the federal district court adopted the map proposed by Hastert and other Republican members of the Illinois Congressional delegation.   Subsequent lawsuits challenging the redistricting as racially biased did not succeed in redrawing the district boundaries. The district, as it was in 2009, was in some places less than 50 metres wide and parts covered no more than one city block.

Geographic boundaries

2011 redistricting

The 4th district includes the Chicago community of Brighton Park, in addition to almost all of Hermosa, Lower West Side and Gage Park; parts of Albany Park, Irving Park, Avondale, Logan Square, West Town, Humboldt Park, Belmont Cragin, Austin, McKinley Park, South Lawndale, New City, West Elsdon and Archer Heights; portions of riverfront Bridgeport; the portion of North Center southwest of Clybourn Avenue; and the northwestern tip of Lincoln Park.
Since the 2011 redistricting, the district also includes portions of Berwyn, Brookfield, Cicero, Lyons, Melrose Park, Riverside, River Forest, and Elmwood Park.

2021 redistricting

Due to the 2020 redistricting, this district will be primarily based around Chicago's Southwest Side and central Cook County, as well as a portion of eastern DuPage.

The 3rd district takes in the Chicago neighborhoods of Brighton Park, West Elsdon, and South Lawndale; most of New City, Pilsen, and Chicago Lawn; the part of Clearing east of S Austin Ave and W Austin Ave; eastern Garfield Ridge; and half of Bridgeport west of S Halsted St.

Outside the Chicago city limits, this district takes in the Cook County communities of Burbank, Berwyn, Cicero, Brookfield, LaGrange Park, Northlake, and Melrose Park; most of Berkeley; and the portion of Franklin Park south of Franklin Ave.

DuPage County is split between this district and the 6th district. They are partitioned by Illinois Highway 64, York St, Euclid Ave, Illinois Highway 38, Illinois Highway 83, West 22nd St, Kingston Dr, Regent Drive, 31st St, Kingey Highway, East Ogden Ave, Naperville Rd, Middaugh Rd, West Chicago Ave, North Prospect Ave, Walker Ave, 55th St, and  59th St.The 4th district takes in the municipalities of Hinsdale; part of Elmhurst; and part of Oak Brook.

Voting

Prominent representatives

List of members representing the district

Election results

2012

2014

2016

2018

2020

2022

See also

Illinois's congressional districts
List of United States congressional districts
Gerrymandering
United States House of Representatives elections in Illinois, 2006
United States House of Representatives elections in Illinois, 2008
United States House of Representatives elections in Illinois, 2010
United States House of Representatives elections in Illinois, 2012
United States House of Representatives elections in Illinois, 2014
United States House of Representatives elections in Illinois, 2016

References

 Congressional Biographical Directory of the United States 1774–present

External links
Washington Post page on the 4th District of Illinois
U.S. Census Bureau – 4th District Fact Sheet
 

04
Congress-04
Constituencies established in 1843
1843 establishments in Illinois